{{Taxobox
| name               = Synodontis sp. nov. 'Lower Tana| image              = 
| status             = DD | status_system = IUCN3.1
| regnum             = Animalia
| phylum             = Chordata
| classis            = Actinopterygii
| ordo               = Siluriformes
| familia            = Mochokidae
| genus              = Synodontis
| species            = S. sp. nov. 'Lower Tana'| binomial           = Synodontis sp. nov. 'Lower Tana| binomial_authority = 
| synonyms           = 
}}Synodontis sp. nov. 'Lower Tana' is a species of fish in the family Mochokidae. It is endemic to Kenya. Its natural habitat is rivers.

Sources

sp. nov. 'Lower Tana'
Endemic freshwater fish of Kenya
Undescribed vertebrate species
Taxonomy articles created by Polbot
Taxobox binomials not recognized by IUCN